Edward Geary Lansdale (February 6, 1908 – February 23, 1987) was a United States Air Force officer until retiring in 1963 as a major general before continuing his work with the Central Intelligence Agency (CIA). Lansdale was a pioneer in clandestine operations and psychological warfare.  In the early 1950s, Lansdale played a significant role in suppressing the Huk insurgency in the Philippines. In 1954, he moved to Saigon and started the Saigon Military Mission, a covert intelligence operation which was created to sow dissension in North Vietnam. Lansdale believed the United States could win guerrilla wars by studying the enemy's psychology, an approach that won the approval of the presidential administrations of both Kennedy and Johnson.

Early life
Lansdale was born in Detroit, Michigan, on February 6, 1908, and later raised in Los Angeles. He was the second of four sons of Sarah Frances Philips and Henry Lansdale. Lansdale attended school in Michigan, New York and California before attending UCLA where he earned his way largely by writing for newspapers and magazines. He later moved on to better-paying work in advertising in Los Angeles and San Francisco.

Career

Philippines
Lansdale served with the Office of Strategic Services in World War II, ultimately being promoted to major. He extended his tour to remain in the Philippines until 1948, helping the Philippine Army rebuild its intelligence services and resolve the cases of large numbers of prisoners of war. With most of Lansdale's prior Army intelligence officer experience being with U.S. Army Air Forces units, he transferred to the U.S. Air Force and was commissioned as a captain when it was established as an independent service in 1947. After leaving the Philippines in 1948, he served as an instructor at the Strategic Intelligence School at Lowry Air Force Base, Colorado, where he received a temporary promotion to lieutenant colonel in 1949. 

In 1950, President Elpidio Quirino personally requested that Lansdale be transferred to the Joint United States Military Assistance Group, Philippines, to assist the intelligence services of the Armed Forces of the Philippines in combating the Communist Hukbalahap. Lansdale was an early practitioner of psychological warfare. Adopting a tactic previously used in the Philippines by the Imperial Japanese Army during World War II, Lansdale spread rumors that Aswangs, blood-sucking demons in Philippine folklore, were loose in the jungle. His men then captured an enemy soldier and drained the blood from his body, leaving the corpse where it could be seen and making the Hukbalahap flee the region.  

Lansdale became friends with Ramon Magsaysay, then the secretary of national defense, and with his help Magsaysay eventually became President of the Philippines on December 30, 1953. Lansdale is said to have run Magsaysay's campaign for the CIA in the 1953 Philippines General Election. Lansdale helped the Philippine Armed Forces develop psychological operations, civic actions, and the rehabilitation of Hukbalahap prisoners.

Vietnam

After successfully ending the left-wing Huk insurgency in the Philippines and building support for Magsaysay's presidency, CIA director Allen Dulles instructed Lansdale to "do what you did in the Philippines [in Vietnam]." Lansdale had previously been a member of General John W. O'Daniel's mission to Indo-China in 1953, acting as an advisor to French forces on special counter-guerrilla operations against the Viet Minh. From 1954 to 1957, he was stationed in Saigon as the head of the Saigon Military Mission. During this period, he was active in the training of the Vietnamese National Army (VNA), organizing the Caodaist militias under Trình Minh Thế in an attempt to bolster the VNA, a propaganda campaign encouraging Vietnam's Catholics to move to the south as part of Operation Passage to Freedom, and spreading claims that North Vietnamese agents were making attacks in South Vietnam. 

Operation Passage to Freedom changed the religious balance in Vietnam. Before the war, the majority of Vietnamese Catholics lived in North Vietnam, but after the operation the South held the majority, 55% of which were refugees from the North. Lansdale accomplished that by dropping leaflets in the Northern hamlets stating that "Christ has gone to the South" and other leaflets showing maps with concentric circles emanating from Hanoi suggesting an imminent nuclear bomb strike on the Northern capital.

During his time in Vietnam, Lansdale quickly ingratiated himself with Ngo Dinh Diem, the leader of South Vietnam. Diem, typically suspicious of anyone not in his immediate family, invited Lansdale to move into the presidential palace after which they became friends. In October 1954, Lansdale foiled a coup attempt, cutting General Nguyễn Văn Hinh's communication off from his top lieutenants by moving them to Manila. 

Lansdale mentored and trained Phạm Xuân Ẩn, a reporter for Time magazine who was actually a highly placed North Vietnamese spy. In 1961, he helped to publicize the story of Father Nguyễn Lạc Hoá, the "fighting priest" who had organized a crack militia, the Sea Swallows, from his village of anticommunist Chinese Catholic exiles. In 1961, Lansdale recruited John M. Deutch to his first job in government, working as one of Robert McNamara's "Whiz Kids". Deutch would go on to become the Director of Central Intelligence for the CIA. Lansdale during this time traveled to Vietnam with a young Daniel Ellsberg who would work in the U.S. Embassy there.

Anti-Castro campaign
From 1957 to 1963, Lansdale worked for the Department of Defense in Washington, serving as Deputy Assistant Secretary for Special Operations, Staff Member of the President's Committee on Military Assistance, and Assistant Secretary of Defense for Special Operations. During the early 1960s, he was chiefly involved in clandestine efforts to topple the government of Cuba, including proposals to assassinate Fidel Castro. Much of this work was under the aegis of "Operation Mongoose", which was the operational name for the CIA plan to topple Castro's government. According to Daniel Ellsberg, who was at one time a subordinate to Lansdale, Lansdale claimed that he was fired by President Kennedy's Defense Secretary Robert McNamara after he declined Kennedy's offer to play a role in the overthrow of the Diem regime.

Late career and personal life

Lansdale retired from the Air Force on November 1, 1963. Yet from 1965 to 1968, he was back in Vietnam where he worked in the United States Embassy, Saigon, with the rank of minister. The scope of his delegated authority was vague, however, and he was bureaucratically marginalized and frustrated. His 1972 memoir, In the Midst of Wars. An American's Mission to Southeast Asia, covers his time in the Philippines and Vietnam up to December 1956.

Lansdale's biography, The Unquiet American, was written by Cecil Currey and published in 1988; the title refers to the common, but incorrect, belief that the eponymous character in Graham Greene's novel The Quiet American was based on Lansdale. According to Norman Sherry's authorized biography of Greene The Life of Graham Greene (Penguin, 2004), Lansdale did not officially enter the Vietnam arena until 1954, while Greene wrote his book in 1952 after departing Vietnam.  It is more likely that he was the inspiration for the character Colonel Hillandale in Eugene Burdick's and William Lederer's joint novel The Ugly American published in 1958.  Many of Lansdale's private papers and effects were destroyed in a fire at his McLean home in 1972.  In 1981, Lansdale donated most of his remaining papers to Stanford University's Hoover Institution.

Lansdale died of a heart ailment on February 23, 1987. He is buried at Arlington National Cemetery. He was twice married and had two sons from his first marriage.

Publications
 Memorandum from Lansdale to Wesley Fishel (September 6, 1955)
 Memorandum from Lansdale to Wesley Fishel (December, 19 1954)
 Letter from Lansdale to Wesley Fishel (May 1, 1961)

References

Further reading
 
 Louis Menand, "Made in Vietnam:  Edward Lansdale and the war over the war" (review of Max Boot, The Road Not Taken:  Edward Lansdale and the American Tragedy in Vietnam, The New Yorker, 26 February 2018, pp. 63–69.
 Currey, Cecil B. Edward Lansdale, the Unquiet American (Houghton Mifflin, 1988).
 Fish, Lydia M. "General Edward G. Lansdale and the folksongs of Americans in the Vietnam War." Journal of American Folklore, vol. 102, no. 406 (Oct. 1989): 390–411. American Folklore Society. . . Archived from the original.
 Freedman, Lawrence D. "The Road Not Taken: Edward Lansdale and the American Tragedy in Vietnam." Foreign Affairs 97.3 (2018): 195.
 McAllister, James. "The lost revolution: Edward Lansdale and the American defeat in Vietnam 1964–1968." Small Wars and Insurgencies 14.2 (2003): 1–26.
 Nashel, Jonathan. Edward Lansdale's Cold War (Univ of Massachusetts Press, 2005).

External links

Official Air Force Biography
James Gibney, "The Ugly American." Review of Edward Lansdale's Cold War, by Jonathan Nashel. New York Times, January 15, 2006.
Marc D. Bernstein, History.net,  Ed Lansdale's Black Warfare in 1950s Vietnam
 Imperial War Museum Interview
 

1908 births
1987 deaths
United States Air Force personnel of the Vietnam War
United States Army personnel of World War II
Burials at Arlington National Cemetery
Counterinsurgency theorists
Military personnel from Detroit
People of the Office of Strategic Services
Recipients of the Distinguished Service Medal (US Army)
United States Air Force generals
United States Army officers
University of California, Los Angeles alumni
People of the Central Intelligence Agency
CIA personnel of the Vietnam War